Taraxacum minimum is a species of plants in the family Asteraceae.

Sources

References 

minimum
Flora of Malta